The Ipiranga Brook (in Portuguese: Riacho do Ipiranga), is a river of São Paulo state in southeastern Brazil, historically known as the place where Dom Pedro I declared the independence of Brazil from the United Kingdom of Portugal, Brazil and the Algarves.

Its name derives from the Tupi words: "Y", which means water or river, and "Piranga", which means red.  It is also mentioned in the country's national anthem.

Declaration of Independence

On September 2, 1822, a decree with Lisbon's demands arrived in Rio de Janeiro, while Prince Pedro was in São Paulo. Princess Maria Leopoldina, acting as Princess Regent, met with the Council of Ministers and decided to send her husband a letter advising him to proclaim Brazil's independence. The letter reached Prince Pedro on September 7, 1822. That same day, in a famous scene at the shore of the Ipiranga Brook, he declared the country's independence, ending 322 years of colonial dominance of Portugal over Brazil. According to journalist Laurentino Gomes, who wrote a book about the event, 1822, Prince Pedro "could not wait for his arrival to São Paulo to announce the decision"; Pedro "was a reckless man in his decisions but he had the profile of leader that Brazil needed at the time, because there was no time to think".

See also
List of rivers of São Paulo
Independence Day (Brazil)
1822 (book by Laurentino Gomes)
Independence or Death (painting)

References

External links
Brazilian Ministry of Transport

Rivers of São Paulo (state)